Samuel Jendai Kamei (born 1 May 1959) is an Indian politician, belonging to the North Eastern district Tamenglong, Manipur. He was elected to the Manipur Legislative Assembly from Tamenglong constituency in the 1995, 2000, 2002 and 2017 Manipur Legislative Assembly election. Previously, he was a member of Manipur State Congress Party, Federal Party of Manipur and Naga People's Front and Bhartiya Janata Party.

References

Living people
Naga people
Bharatiya Janata Party politicians from Manipur
Manipur State Congress Party politicians
Federal Party of Manipur politicians
Naga People's Front politicians
People from Tamenglong district
Manipur MLAs 2017–2022
Samata Party politicians
Manipur MLAs 1995–2000
Manipur MLAs 2000–2002
Manipur MLAs 2002–2007
1959 births